Carlo de Fornaro (sometimes spelled Carlo di Fornaro) (1872–1949) was an artist, caricaturist, writer, humorist, and revolutionary.

His work is in the collection of the US National Gallery of Art and Harvard's Fogg Art Museum. His caricatures have been compared to those of Sem, Leonetto Cappiello, and Carlo Pellegrini.

His 1902 book Millionaires of America contains color caricatures of the captains of American industry.

Life

Fornaro was born in Calcutta to "Swiss-Italian" parents. He was raised in Italy and Switzerland, then studied architecture in Zurich and painting at the Royal Academy of Munich. He came to the US as a young man and began his career as a newspaper caricaturist, first in Chicago for the Times-Herald, then in New York for the Herald, Morning Telegraph, World, and Evening Sun.

In 1906, he traveled to Mexico with his friend Benjamin De Casseres. They became involved in radical politics, and joined the opposition to Mexico's president Porfirio Díaz. They joined the staff of the newly-formed newspaper El Diario, which opposed Díaz, with de Fornaro becoming the artistic director of its Sunday edition, El Diario Illustrado. He returned to New York in 1909, and published his Diaz, Czar of Mexico: an arraignment, which led to a trial for criminal libel against a nonresident by the editor of the Mexican newspaper El Imparcial. He was convicted and sentenced to one year in the Blackwell's Island Prison (now Roosevelt Island), where he served 8 months, and upon his release, was fêted by the Vagabonds lunch group of the National Arts Club. He was also invited to a dinner at Joel's Bohemia on October 4, 1910, and in that year drew caricatures for that restaurant's celebrity wall.

He documented his incarceration in the book A modern purgatory and advocated for prison reform. He was a member of the National Arts Club.

He died in 1949 after a year of poor health.

Bibliography
 Carlo de Fornaro, Chicago's anointed: 16 caricatures, 18??
 Carlo de Fornaro (text and illustrations), Gem Legends for Marcus & Co., 11 brochures:
 Krishna's Gift, the legend of the diamond
 Prince Tissa, the legend of the ruby
 Amrita, the legend of the sapphire
 Vanadeva: the legend of the emerald
 Uttara: the legend of the turquoise
 Asneha: the legend of the opal
 Isvara's ring: the legend of the jade
 The necklace of untold sighs the legend of the coral
 The tear of Soma: the legend of the pearl
 The tears of Kusa: the legend of the topaz
 Shiva: "the Destroyer": the legend of the moonstone
 White lotus: the legend of the cat's eye
 Max Cramer de Pourtalès, Carlo de Fornaro, Millionaires of America, New York, 1902 full view
 Carlo de Fornaro, Diaz, Czar of Mexico: an arraignment, by Carlo de Fornaro with an open letter to Theodore Roosevelt, 1909 full view
 Carlo de Fornaro, Mortals and Immortals, 1911 full view
 Carlo de Fornaro, Carranza and Mexico, New York: Mitchell Kennerley, 1915 full text
 Carlo de Fornaro, What the Catholic Church has done to Mexico, Latin American News Association, 1916
 Carlo de Fornaro, A Modern Purgatory, New York, 1917 full view
 Paul Eldridge, Carlo de Fornaro (cover design), And the Sphinx Spoke, Boston: The Stratford Company, 1921
 Giacomo Casanova, Carlo de Fornaro (translator), Memoirs of Jacques Casanova, New York: Lieber & Lewis, 1923
 Carlo de Fornaro, John Wenger, New York: Joseph Lawren, 1925
 Carlo de Fornaro (translator), A. Zaidenberg (illustrator), The Arabian Droll Stories, New York: The Lotus Society, 1929
 Carlo de Fornaro, The Chinese Decameron, New York: The Lotus Society, 1929

Notes

1872 births
1949 deaths
Academy of Fine Arts, Munich alumni
American caricaturists
American humorists
American revolutionaries
Mexican journalists
American writers